"In Degrees" is the fourth single by British indie rock band, Foals off their fifth studio album, Everything Not Saved Will Be Lost – Part 1. The single, released 10 May 2019 was supplemented by a house/club remix by German EDM producer/DJ Purple Disco Machine and an official music video which premiered a few days later on 15 May 2019.

Music video
The music video, directed by Aaron Brown (of L.A production, Focus Creeps) was released 15 May 2019.

Filmed in Brazil, the video features the band (including touring members Jeremy Pritchard and percussionist Kit Montieth) dressed in tropical apparel performing within the "Ilha Musical" (Musical Island), an amphitheater (a notable tourist attraction for its brutalist design by Décio Tozzi) located in the Villa-Lobos State Park in Sao Paulo during an outdoor rave between sunset and nightfall.

Track listing

Charts

References

2019 singles
2019 songs
Foals songs
Transgressive Records singles
Songs written by Yannis Philippakis
Environmental songs
Warner Records singles